Genia tou Chaous (Chaos Generation), was a Greek punk band of the 1980s. The lyrics and the music were of punk origin, with a gothic, pessimistic attitude and clear heavy metal elements.

Members
 Nikos Vosdoganis - guitar
 Nikos Vosdoganis - bass guitar
 Aris Lampidis		
 Θοδωρής Ηλιακόπουλος - vocals, drums
 Kostas Harzopoulos - guitar
 Άκης Αμπραζής - bass guitar, vocals
 Αλέξης Αλιφέρης - bass guitar, keyboards
 Δημήτρης Παππάς - guitar, vocals
 Giorgos Drakopoulos  - keyboards

Discography

External links
 www.punk.gr
 rehearsal
 demo
 www.greekpunk.net
 youtube  youtube 
 Γενιά Του Χάους (in Greek)

Greek punk rock groups